Tsutomu Fujii (1840–1880) was a Japanese politician who served as governor of Hiroshima Prefecture in 1875–1880.

Governors of Hiroshima
1840 births
1880 deaths
Japanese Home Ministry government officials